Archimandrite Charalambos (Galanopoulos) of Dionysiou (or Haralambos Dionysiatis, ; Russia, 1910 – Dionysiou Monastery, Mount Athos, 1 January 2001) was a Greek Orthodox Christian monk who served as the abbot of Dionysiou Monastery from 1979 to 2000.

Early life
In 1910, he was born in southern Russia to Pontic Greek parents, namely Leonidas (Λεωνίδας) and Despina (Δέσποινα) Galanopoulos. He and his family moved to Arkadiko, Drama (Αρκαδικό της Δράμας) in 1922. He moved to the Little Saint Anne's Skete at Mount Athos in September 1950, where he became a disciple of Joseph the Hesychast. Later, he moved with Joseph the Hesychast and his disciples to New Skete. When Joseph the Hesychast died in 1959, he remained at New Skete until 1967. In 1967, Charalambos and his 12 disciples moved to Bourazeri, near Karyes. By 1979, Charalambos had 20 disciples.

In 1979, he was ordained as the abbot of Dionysiou Monastery, succeeding Archimandrite Gabriel of Dionysiou who had been Abbot of Dionysiou since 1936.

Archimandrite Charalambos died at Dionysiou Monastery on 1 January 2001. His remains were exhumed in 2021.

See also
Gabriel of Dionysiou
Ephraim of Vatopedi
Joseph the Hesychast

Further reading

References

1910 births
2001 deaths
Athonite Fathers
Eastern Orthodox monks
Pontic Greeks
Archimandrites
People associated with Dionysiou Monastery
People from Drama, Greece
Disciples of Joseph the Hesychast
Russian expatriates in Greece